Désiré Beaurain (2 September 1881 – 24 October 1963) was a Belgian fencer. He won a bronze medal at the 1908 Summer Olympics and a silver medal at the 1924 Summer Olympics.

References

External links
 

1881 births
1963 deaths
Belgian male fencers
Belgian épée fencers
Belgian foil fencers
Olympic fencers of Belgium
Fencers at the 1908 Summer Olympics
Fencers at the 1924 Summer Olympics
Olympic silver medalists for Belgium
Olympic bronze medalists for Belgium
Olympic medalists in fencing
Medalists at the 1908 Summer Olympics
Medalists at the 1924 Summer Olympics
20th-century Belgian people